Shailer may refer to:

 Trevor Shailer (born 1970), New Zealand boxer
 Shailer Mathews (1863–1941), American theologian
 Shailer Park, Queensland, suburb